Robert L. Myers III (May 15, 1928 – February 5, 1993) was a former member of the Pennsylvania State Senate, serving from 1974 to 1976.

References

Democratic Party Pennsylvania state senators
1993 deaths
1928 births
20th-century American politicians
People from Camp Hill, Pennsylvania